Frady is an uncommon surname.  Frady is of American origin, likely translated from the German "Vrede."

It may refer to the following notable people:

 Greg Frady (born 1962), American college baseball coach
 Marshall Frady (1940–2004), American journalist and author
 Nicole Lane Frady (born 1983), American musician